The canton of Andernos-les-Bains is an administrative division of the Gironde department, southwestern France. It was created at the French canton reorganisation which came into effect in March 2015. Its seat is in Andernos-les-Bains.

It consists of the following communes:
Andernos-les-Bains
Arès
Audenge
Biganos
Lanton
Lège-Cap-Ferret

Representation

References

Cantons of Gironde